Harutaeographa siva is a moth of the family Noctuidae. It is found in northern India.

References

Moths described in 1996
Orthosiini